Malaysian popular music, sometimes called shortly Malaysian pop or abbreviated as M-pop, refers to popular music forms in Malaysia. Although popular music in various languages such as Mandopop are popular and have been produced in Malaysia, Malaysian pop refers to music recorded primarily in the Malay language in Malaysia.

Malaysian pop covers a diverse musical genres, such as pop, rock, Ballad, Malaysian Folk Music, hip hop, electronic, and R&B music.

Origin and influences

Malaysian popular music has its origin in local musical tradition and popular European music styles. Some of the early musical styles, performers, and songs of Kroncong and lagu-lagu rakyat (folk songs) were common to the musical culture of Malaysia and Indonesia. Starting in the 1920s, local social dance and entertainment music such as asli, inang, joget, dondang sayang, zapin and masri were adapted by Bangsawan troupes to Anglo-American dance band arrangement but keeping the local folk character, and developed into modern Malay popular music. The Bangsawan troupes originated in the 19th century as a form of opera called Wayang Parsi that developed as an adaptation of Persian theatre brought to Malaya by performers from Bombay. They portrayed stories from diverse groups such as Indian, Western, Islamic, Chinese, Indonesian and Malay with music, dance and acting in costumes. The musicians were mostly local Malays, Filipinos and Goans.  Famous early singers such as Temah, Tijah and Dean often incorporated Chinese, Middle Eastern and Indian elements in their songs.

Western popular music has continually influenced Malaysian popular music since its early days.  In the pre-World War II era, songs based on Anglo-American and Latin-American dance music sung in Malay were very popular.  These songs were accompanied by dance bands that became known as orkes Melayu (Malay orchestra).  The orkes Melayu, which influenced dangdut, was played at dance halls in amusement parks, bangsawan shows and other festivities.  Early singers were often Filipinos originally brought to Malaya by the British to form the Selangor State Band (a military band), for example Soliano, D'Cruz and Martinez. In the 1960s and 1970s, influenced by Western rock bands, a modified rock combo called kugiran (an acronym of "kumpulan gitar rancak", meaning rhythmic guitar bands) often accompanied singers.   From the 1970s to 1980s, a Western orchestral sound also became popular as musical accompaniment in albums, which is widely assumed to be due to the influence of RTM Orchestra.

Other musical forms such as Indian, Islamic and other Asian popular music have also exerted their influences at various times, and many international trends in music surfaced in Malaysian pop.  Hindustani music had a long influence on many traditional types of music in the Malay Peninsula, for example in the use of instruments such as the tabla and in the vocal styles of the singers.  More recently, music of J-pop and K-pop have become influential.

History

Early era

The first recording of music in Malaya was made 1903 by Fred Gaisberg of the Gramophone Company who was sent to record local music in Asia. During the colonial period, Singapore was the center of Malay music industry and recordings were done at the EMI studio there, but the center began to shift to Kuala Lumpur after Malayan independence in 1957, especially after the separation of Singapore in 1965. Until the 1960s, few records were produced locally, and recordings of the singers and film stars done in Malaya were pressed in India and the records sent back to Malaya for sale.

One of the earliest modern Malay pop songs was "Tudung Periok", sung by Momo Latiff, who recorded it in the 1930s. Many of the singing stars became popular through Malay films in the early era.  In the 1940s and 1950s, singers who achieved popularity through their films and recordings were P.Ramlee, R. Azmi, Jasni, Ahmad C. B., S. M. Salim, Saloma, Momo Latif, and Nona Aisha. Some of these singers had Bangsawan or Kroncong background.  The songs of this era were influenced by foreign music styles such as those of Latin American dance, Hawaiian music and Indian films.  They were also mostly romantic in nature, in what might be called the "hatimu hatiku" ("your heart, my heart") syndrome, and for decades Malay pop music was dominated by songs with words like sayang (love), cinta (love) and gadis (girl) in the title.

The most important of the early singers was P. Ramlee whose career spanned a period from the late 1940s through to the early 1970s.  He became the most popular Malay singer and composer with a range of songs such as "Azizah", "Gelora", "Dendang Perantau" and the evergreen "Di Mana Kan Ku Cari Ganti".  It has been estimated that he wrote over a thousand songs and recorded around five hundred, some of which still remain popular today.

1960s: Pop Yeh-yeh

In the 1960s, Western pop music was particularly influential on local music scenes in Malaysia, Singapore, and Brunei. When Cliff Richard and the Shadows played in Singapore in 1961, he inspired many copycat acts, and public viewing of the Cliff Richard's films in the region were often augmented with local cover bands emulating their songs.  One particular genre influenced by Western guitar-band called 'Pop Yeh-yeh' came to the forefront and ruled the Malay music scene from 1965 to 1971. This genre was influenced by the music and fashion of The Beatles and other British rock and roll bands during the 1960s that also generally influenced the Malay music industry of that period. In fact, the term "pop yeh-yeh" was taken from a line from the popular Beatles song, "She Loves You" ("she loves you, yeah-yeah-yeah").
Southern European yé-yé music has the same etymology.
The term "pop yeh yeh" however was never used in the 1960s but used much later when such music was revived in the 1980s by M. Shariff & The Zurah. It might be that music journalists of the 1980s coined the term.

The first local song in the Pop Yeh-yeh vein was a song called "Suzanna", sung by M Osman in 1964. During the height of the pop yeh-yeh craze, a lot of the bands that were formed tried their best to mimic The Beatles in their look, songwriting and performance style, yet the musical style was still taken from The Shadows and The Ventures. These bands, known as kirtans, consists usually of four members who sing on top of handling the basic four musical instruments (two electric guitars, an electric bass, and drums). Most of the bands were formed in both Singapore and Malaysia, with the southern state of Johore and Singapore was the hub of activity for these particular bands. Most of the recordings were done in Singapore such as at the old EMI Studio at MacDonald's House in Orchard Road and many small privately owned studios.

The acronym "Kugiran" was first known to the public through Radio Singapore's weekly top chart program "Lagu Pujaan Minggu Ini" which was hosted by disc jockey Mohd Ismail Abdullah, also known as DJ M.I.A. The origin of the derived acronym "kumpulan gitar rancak" ("fast guitar music group") varies: some say it was the idea of a subtitling officer, Daud Abdul Rahman, others say it was P. Ramlee who coined the term to differentiate it from the combo styled Malay bands of earlier times. A Kugiran consists of 5 piece band members and a vocalist, one lead-guitarist, one bassist, one rhythm-guitarist, one organist (keyboardist) and a drummer.

The formation and development of Kugiran encouraged the establishment and existence of various recording companies in Singapore in the 1960s and a lot of these songs were recorded on vinyl and sold well commercially. Some of the singers who made their name during that period include among others M Osman, A Ramlie, Jeffrydin, Roziah Latiff & The Jayhawkers, Adnan Othman, Halim "Jandaku" Yatim, Afidah Es, J Kamisah, Siti Zaiton, J. Sham, A Rahman Onn, Hasnah Haron, J Kamisah, Fatimah M Amin, Asmah Atan, Orkid Abdullah, A. Remie, Zamzam, Salim I, Kassim Selamat, M Rahmat, A Karim Jais, M Ishak, Hussien Ismail, Jaafar O, A Halim, Azizah Mohamed, S Jibeng and L Ramlee. Other popular rock and pop bands of the period include The Rhythm Boys, The Siglap Five, The Hooks which featured A Romzi as their lead vocalist (they scored a hit with the song "Dendang Remaja"), Siglap Boys, Les Kafilas, Cliffters featuring Rikieno Bajuri, Impian Bateks featuring Run Al-Haj with his popular number "Naik Kereta Ku" and a cappella like "Oh Posmen", "Gadis Sekolah" etc., The Swallows featuring "La Aube", "Angkut-angkut Bilis" etc. whose vocalist was Kassim Selamat and the EP was featured in a radio station in Germany. There, "La Aube" was in the German pop chart. Almost all the above-mentioned artistes were Singaporeans. The most popular ones from the Malaysian side of the divide must include L. Ramli, Roziah Latiff & The Jayhawkers, J.Sham, Orkes Nirvana, The Sangam Boys and Les Flingers. The music and lyrics were usually composed by the bands themselves. The band leaders were also the producers of the albums of the period.

The golden age of pop yeh-yeh started to dwindle in 1971. Since the fall of the popularity of pop yeh-yeh, the center of the Malaysia music industry shifted up north from Singapore to Malaysia's capital Kuala Lumpur. A lot of composers, songwriters, lyricists, singers, and producers started to gain foothold not only in Kuala Lumpur but also in other cities including Johor Bahru and Ipoh to grab the opportunity of the emerging and rapidly changing Malaysian music industry.

1970s to 1980s 

DJ Dave, Hail Amir and Uji Rashid introduced Hindustani-influenced music in the 1970s. Between the late 1970s and mid-1980s, the market for local recordings and artiste was in big demand, bands and musicians performing in clubs and pubs were contracted to record. Although The Jayhawkers led by Joe Chelliah was the first wholly non-Malay pop band to record Malay pop songs as a precursor, it was in the mid-1970s that later non-Malay artistes, bands and businessmen ventured into the Malay music industry. Bands like Alleycats, Headwind, Discovery, Carefree and Cenderawasih took the lead to modernize Malaysian Pop music; solo singers like Sudirman Arshad and Sharifah Aini further push the music to its peak. Between 1979 and early 1980, the emergence of blues outfit/band called The Blues Gang in Malaysia specialising in blues and hard rock/heavy metal outfit/band called Sweet Charity from Singapore have changed the Malaysian music scene.

Jamal Abdillah rose to fame in the 80s after winning Bintang RTM, following the footsteps of Sudirman Arshad. Along with Sudirman, Jamal became the new pop sensation with his masculine voice, ability to sing traditional Malay songs along with his good looking image. There are several male singers after Jamal who also rose to fame with pop music such as his biggest rival - Aman Shah, Shidee, Nassier Wahab and Rahim Maarof (who later shifted to pioneer rock movement in the late 80s).

International artiste like Shake (singer) debuted in 1976 in France with french language LP and return to Malaysia in the early 1980 to produce Malay music while still based in France for global market. In the late 80s, Malaysian student turned vocalist Aishah did the same thing like Shake, she signed a record deal with New Zealand based label with her band The Fan Club. The band released two studio album and one of their singles,"Don't Let Me Fall Alone" charted in Billboard Hot 100, which made Aishah as the first Malaysian artiste to enter the US popular song chart.

Slow rock, heavy metal and hard rock and the blues also became predominant in the early 1980s, where bands of these genres tend to take a page from popular Western bands like Scorpions, Led Zeppelin, Deep Purple and Def Leppard.

M. Nasir – previously of the Singaporean folk rock band Kembara – played a leading role in shaping rock music in Malaysia for a period of almost ten years, working as a songwriter and producer. He produced local rock bands like Search and Wings as well as solo artiste like Rahim Maarof and took them to their highest level of Malaysian rock music. Infringement in the form of duplicating cassettes and CDs became rampant and uncontrollable around this period as sales of these items soar which was supported by the country's wave of economic boom.

Between the mid 80s and early 90s, R&B and Pop music became the focus of the urban youngsters. This music was cosmopolitan and catered to a professional and educated crowd. In 1985, Sheila Majid debuted with an album called "Dimensi Baru" which was financed and produced by Roslan Aziz himself. With a lovely mellow voice together with a bunch of creative musicians like Mac Chew and Jenny Chin both influenced by R&B, fusion and jazz achieved their dreams and set a new direction for many Malaysian R&B artistes to come. This was evidently clear when her second album Emosi was released in Indonesia and earned the Best R&B Album in the prestigious BASF awards in 1986. This historical release has changed the facet of the music industry.

Another female pop singer Ramlah Ram also make huge waves in the late 80s with her Malay-pop and dangdut numbers. Ramlah second album in 1988 becoming highest selling Malay album with 200,000 copies.

1990s

In 1991, Dato Zainal Abidin – who was a member of the rock act Headwind – released a self-titled solo album, incorporating elements of world music (even including influences such as Paul Simon's album Graceland), plus lyrics that carried social and environmental commentaries. The album became critically and commercially acclaimed, its songs considered a refreshing break from the contemporary melancholic rock ballads that were prevalent at the time.

Local rap and hip-hop also began to flourish with the success of 7-man group 4U2C in the mid-1990s, receiving several gold and platinum wins while three-brother group KRU, wrote numerous rap and hip-hop numbers.

It was also during this decade too that there was fierce competition among pop singers to get their songs to the top of their charts; such as  Aris Ariwatan, Fauziah Latiff, Aishah, Hattan, Awie, Ziana Zain, Ning Baizura, Ella, Amy Mastura and Sheila Majid along pop bands like Slam, Ukays and Spring. Aishah and Rahim Maarof was the most popular artist from 1990 to 1992, followed by Jamal, Ella and Fauziah Latiff (1993), M. Nasir, Ukays, and Amy Mastura (1994) and Awie, Aris and Ziana Zain (1995) and Slam and KRU (1996).

Mid 1990s marked the era when pop music with traditional elements like dangdut and Malay ethnic shake the market with best selling albums from singers like Iwan, Amelina, Mas Idayu, Noraniza Idris, To'ki and M. Nasir. With contemporary touch, these singers managed to uplift Malay traditional music to another level.

In 1996, a schoolgirl by the name of Siti Nurhaliza from the rural town of Kuala Lipis, Pahang released an album produced by talented producer Adnan Abu Hassan. This album of Malay Pop genre was a huge success. She incorporated different genres such as Malay pop, R&B and Malay traditional music in her later albums with much success, eventually becoming Malaysia's most popular singer.

There was also the breakthrough of the nasyid genre into the mainstream market between mid-1990s until the early 2000s. The genre, which uses only vocals and percussion music developed by vocal groups like Raihan, Rabbani and Brothers, gathered a lot of support from the rural and the religious Muslim demographics.

The 2000s and present: influence of reality TV and the internet

2000s started with a movement towards progressive pop composition. Post Siti Nurhaliza, several female singers making huge waves with chart topping-award winning hits such as Liza Hanim, Dayang Nurfaizah and Misha Omar. These singers who rose from singing competition organized by Radio Televisyen Malaysia in the late 90s and early 2000s and discovered by music maestro Adnan Abu Hassan managed to sustain a long lasting career in the next decades alongside Siti. Whereas male pop artist Anuar Zain started his adult singing career in the late 90s and became popular with R&B Pop in the early decade and remain popular ever since. This is also another era for R&B boy band after first batch in the late 90s started with Innuendo, Indigo and Option 1 to the later like Ruffedge, VE and Phyne Ballerz.

Popularity of pop rock band in the 2000s also proved that Malaysian music becoming more progressive. Among notable pop rock artiste with high-selling albums during this era like Exists, Spider, OAG, Flop Poppy, Butterfingers, Def Gab C, Pretty Ugly, Ezlynn, Elyana and pop duo like Ajai & Nurul making another alternate wavelength to cater new listeners.

During the mid 2000s, the introduction to the reality television concept revived public interest in music entertainment. Shows such as Akademi Fantasia and Malaysian Idol allowed the public to choose their own stars by sending SMS through hand phones at the audience's convenience. This excited the public because they were involved in the making of a celebrity and could choose who they wanted instead of relying on record companies for the production and distribution. The winners of these singing competitions tend to be seasonal fads; releasing chart-topping debuts but are later relegated into obscurity (though there are exceptions like Jaclyn Victor, Mawi, Stacy Anam, Aizat Amdan, Akim Ahmad and Hafiz Suip), earning them the moniker Artis Mee Segera ("instant noodle artists"). Comparing from the past decades, pay TVs and Internet have affected the musical taste of young listeners that prefers foreign music. Several reality TV stars like Akim Ahmad had long journey to get noticed in the local music scene only after reformed a pop rock band The Majistret with  personnels from fellow band members.

In the late 2000s, unsigned Malaysian artists who rose to fame on YouTube and indie music bands such as Hujan, Gerhana Skacinta and Bunkface changed the Malaysian music scene. However, this does not represent the active live music circuit by singer-songwriter performers in pubs and cafes. Yunalis Zarai, a former café singer pioneered the acoustic singer-songwriter trend, leading the way for record labels to debut similar acts. YouTube changed the Malaysian musical landscape in the 2010s. Instead of SMS votes, music lovers gave birth to YouTube stars by the number of views, that crossover into the mainstream such as Najwa Latif, Elizabeth Tan, Sufian Suhaimi and Khai Bahar.

YouTube also helped expose unknown foreign music genres such as J-pop and K-pop to the Malaysian audience. The latter's particular worldwide success influenced record companies to try repackage the successful Malaysian boy band and Girl Group formula from the 90s such as KRU, Feminin or 4U2C and bring it to the 2010s. Current active groups are All Star Jefri, Dynda, V.I.P, Max 24:7, Gula-Gula, Forteen, P.O.P and TIGA. KRU from the 90s was active until 2018.

In the 2010s, second generation of reality TV and singing competition stars continue to conquer pop music such as Syamel, Hael Husaini, Ernie Zakri, Ara Johari and Nabila Razali.  The movement to shift Malaysian music to adapt back the 1990s formula was initiated by local labels like Aries Music, FMC and Music Valley started with Aiman Tino, Sufian Suhaimi and Projector Band (2016) as well as Wany Hasrita, Haqiem Rusli and Floor 88 (2017). Dangdut music make another quake in 2010s when Malaysia send delegations of young singers to join Dangdut Akademi Asia from 2015- 2019. With the late Pak Ngah as the judge and Mas Idayu as commentator, Malaysia managed to introduce new dangdut sensation into Indonesian massive markets with names like Shiha Zikir, Syura Badron and Baby Shima Megat got record deals with Indonesian labels. By late 2010s, dangdut music with Malay pop-rock element becoming one of the best selling music in Malaysia.

Apart from that dance pop and hip hop music rise again when big names like Malique, Joe Flizzow, Altimet and Omar K continue recruit and produce progressive music for new wave of hip hop artiste like Sonaone (2014), Defam, Aman Ra (2016) and Yonnyboi, K-Clique, Kid Santhe (2019) as well as popstars like Nanasheme (2015), Ismail Izzani, As'ad Motawh (2017) and Andi Bernadee, Naim Daniel (2018).

Challenges
By the late 1990s with the Internet increasing user base, downloading mp3 files through Napster was rampant. Unlicensed CDs were sold in fly-by-night shops and illegal CD hawkers at night markets. Priced at 1/4 of the original price, legal CD albums were no match for these outlets.

There are many factors that have caused the Malaysian music industry to decline:
 Excessive copying (copyright infringement is not a new phenomenon in Malaysian music market, it has been a phenomenon since the 1970s, with bootlegged vinyls and audio cassettes selling at the half of the price of the original product)
 The revenue for Malaysian music industry decreased from over RM300 million in 1997 to only RM60 million in 2009
 Many local record labels out of business
 Illegal downloads
 The price of original cassettes and CDs decreased
 The number of local artists active in the music industry dropped from over 200 in 1997 to less than 100 in 2009
 Local record labels has forced local artists to produce album themselves
 Many local albums released after 2006 have less songs (mostly 5 – 9 songs)

As a result, Malaysia along with its neighboring country Singapore are countries in South East Asia where illegal music copies outsells legal ones. Sales of domestic and international repertoire are in the same levels in both countries compared to other South East Asian nations.

The unauthorized distributing of music CDs has caused all original albums sold in Malaysia, whether local or foreign to be attached with an original hologram sticker since 2000 before it can be sold. At the time of introduction, it only covers audio CDs, cassettes and music VCDs. In 2003, the sticker was updated with hologram feature and now also covers non-music video releases and video games. Also, in 2004, the certification levels were down from 15,000 copies and 25,000 copies to 10,000 copies and 20,000 copies for an album to be certified as Gold and Platinum, respectively.

The encouragement from the Malaysian government towards privatization of broadcasting stations received support from the public. An array of new radio and TV stations were built. Legal ringtone downloads were an unexpected success to music companies. A music single ringtone downloaded 100,000 times are commonplace.

See also
 Music of Malaysia
 Malaysian hip hop
 Malaysian rock
 Malay Pop

References

Malaysian music
Malaysian styles of music
Popular music by country